The Canadian Prairies (usually referred to as simply the Prairies in Canada) is a region in Western Canada. It includes the Canadian portion of the Great Plains and the Prairie Provinces, namely Alberta, Saskatchewan, and Manitoba. These provinces are partially covered by grasslands, plains, and lowlands, mostly in the southern regions. The northernmost reaches of the Canadian Prairies are less dense in population, marked by forests and more variable topography. If the region is defined to include areas only covered by prairie land, the corresponding region is known as the Interior Plains. Physical or ecological aspects of the Canadian Prairies extend to northeastern British Columbia, but that area is not included in political use of the term.

The prairies in Canada are a temperate grassland and shrubland biome within the prairie ecoregion of Canada that consists of northern mixed grasslands in Alberta, Saskatchewan, southern Manitoba, as well as northern short grasslands in southeastern Alberta and southwestern Saskatchewan. The Prairies Ecozone of Canada includes the northern tall grasslands in southern Manitoba and Aspen parkland, which covers central Alberta, central Saskatchewan, and southern Manitoba. The Prairie starts from north of Edmonton and it covers the three provinces in a southward-slanting line east to the Manitoba-Minnesota border. Alberta has the most land classified as prairie, while Manitoba has the least, as the boreal forest begins more southerly in Manitoba than in Alberta.

Main climates 
The core climate of the Canadian prairie region is defined as a semi-arid climate and is often based upon the Köppen climate classification system. This type of classification encompasses five main climate types, with several categoric subtypes based on the precipitation pattern of the region. The majority of the prairie provinces experience snowy, fully humid continental climates with cool summers, also known as class Dfc on the Köppen climate scale. The southernmost regions of the prairies tend to experience fully humid continental climates with warm summers, Dfb. A trifling section surrounding the Alberta-Saskatchewan border has been classified as Bsk, semi-cold and arid climate.

Precipitation events in the Canadian prairies are very important to study as these locations make up 80% of the country's agricultural production. On average, 454 mm of precipitation falls on the prairies each year. Out of the three prairie provinces, Saskatchewan obtains the least amount of precipitation annually (395 mm), with Manitoba receiving the most at 486 mm. Most rainfall typically happens in the summer months such as June and July. With the high humidity of the prairies, tornadoes are likely to occur—marking central Saskatchewan and southern Manitoba as high probability areas. Approximately 72% of tornadoes in Canada are seen across the prairies due to the capability of summer thunderstorm precipitation to mechanically mix with the air adjacent to the relatively flat surface of the region.

Physical geography 

Although the Prairie Provinces region is named for the prairies located within Alberta, Saskatchewan and Manitoba, the physical geography of the three provinces is quite diverse, consisting of portions of the Canadian Shield, the Western Cordillera and the Canadian Interior Plains. The plains comprise both prairies and forests while, with the exception of freshwater along the Hudson Bay, the shield is predominantly forested.

Prairies 
Three main grassland types occur in the Canadian prairies: tallgrass prairie, mixed grass prairie, and fescue prairie (or using the WWF terminology, northern tall grasslands, northern mixed grasslands, and northern short grasslands). Each has a unique geographic distribution and characteristic mix of plant species. All but a fraction of one per cent of the tallgrass prairie has been converted to cropland. What remains occurs on the  plain centred in the Red River Valley in Manitoba. Mixed prairie is more common and is part of the dry interior plains that extend from Canada south to the U.S. state of Texas.

More than half of the remaining native grassland in the Canadian prairies is mixed. Though widespread in southern Saskatchewan and southeastern Alberta, because of extensive cattle grazing, it is estimated that only 24% of the original mixed prairie grassland remains. Fescue prairie occurs in the moister regions, occupying the northern extent of the prairies in central and southwestern Alberta and west-central Saskatchewan.

The southwestern Canadian prairies, supporting brown and black soil types, are semi-arid and highly prone to frequent and severe droughts.
The zones around the cities of Regina and immediately east of Calgary are also very dry. Most heavy precipitation quickly dissipates by the time it passes Cheadle on its way heading east. Frost from October to April (and sometimes even early May) limits the growing season for certain crops.

The eastern section of the Canadian prairies in Manitoba is well watered with several large lakes such as Lake Winnipeg and several large rivers. The area also gets reasonable amounts of precipitation. The middle sections of Alberta and Saskatchewan are also wetter than the south and have better farmland, despite having a shorter frost-free season. The areas around Edmonton and Saskatoon are especially notable as good farmland. Both lie in the northern area of the Palliser's Triangle, and are within aspen parkland a transitional prairie ecozone.

Further north, the area becomes too cold for most agriculture besides wild rice operations and sheep raising, and it is dominated by boreal forest. The Peace Region in northwestern Alberta is an exception, however. It lies north of the 55th Parallel and is warm and dry enough to support extensive farming. Aspen parkland covers the area; The long daylight hours in this region during the summer are an asset despite having an even shorter growing season than central Alberta. In fact, agriculture plays a major economic role in the Peace Region.

Demographics 

In the Canada 2011 Census, the Canadian prairie provinces had a population of 5,886,906, consisting of 3,645,257 in Alberta, 1,208,268 in Manitoba, and 1,033,381 in Saskatchewan, up 8.9% from 5,406,908 in 2006.

Growth 
Some of the prairie region of Canada has seen rapid growth from a boom in oil production since the mid-20th century.
According to StatsCanada, the prairie provinces had a population of 5,886,906 in 2011. In 2016, the population had grown by 14.6% to 6,748,280.

Economy 

In the mid 20th century, the economy of the prairies exploded, due to the oil boom, and introduced a growth of jobs. The primary industries are agriculture and services. Agriculture consisting of livestock (cattle and sheep), cultivating crops (oats, canola, wheat, barley), and production of oil. Due to the production of oil, the service industry expanded in order to provide for the employees of the oil companies extracting the oil. In the 1950s-1970s, the explosion of oil production increased the worth of Alberta and allowing it to become the "nations richest province" and Canada one of the top petroleum exporters in the world. Edmonton and Calgary drew in a larger population with the increase in jobs in the energy field, which causes the jobs supporting this field to grow as well. It was through the steady economic growth that followed this explosion that the prairies region began to switch from an agriculture-based job sector to one with services included.

In 2014, the global market for oil fell and led to a recession, impacting the economy dramatically. Alberta still has an oil dominant economy even as the traditional oil wells dry up, there are oil sands further north (i.e. Fort McMurray) that continue to provide jobs to extract, drill and refine the oil. Saskatchewan, in particular, in the early 20th century grew economically due to the Canadian agricultural boom and produce large crops of wheat. It is said to have a "one-crop economy" due to such dependency on this crop alone, but after 1945 the economy took another turn with technological advancements that allowed for the discovery of uranium, oil, and potash.

Culture and politics 

The Prairies are distinguished from the rest of Canada by cultural and political traits. The oldest influence on Prairie culture are the First Nations, who have inhabited this region for millennia. This region has the highest proportion of Indigenous people in Canada, outside of the "territories." The first Europeans to see the Prairies were fur traders and explorers from eastern Canada (mainly present-day Quebec) and Great Britain via Hudson Bay. They gave rise to the Métis, working class "children of the fur trade." During their settlement by Europeans, the prairies were settled in distinct ethnic block settlements giving  areas distinctively Ukrainian, German, French, or Scandinavian Canadian cultures.

Some areas also developed cultures around their main economic activity. For example, southern Alberta is renowned for its cowboy culture, which developed when real open range ranching was practiced in the 1880s. Canada's first rodeo, the Raymond Stampede, was established in 1902. These influences are also evident in the music of Canada's Prairie Provinces. This can be attributed partially to the massive influx of American settlers who began to migrate to Alberta (and to a lesser extent, Saskatchewan) in the late 1880s because of the lack of available land in the United States.

The Prairie Provinces have given rise to the "prairie protest" movements, such as the Winnipeg General Strike of 1919, the first general strike in Canadian history. These political movements (both of the left and right) tend to feed off of well established feelings of Western alienation, and each one represents a distinct challenge to the perceived Central Canadian elite.

The Prairies continue to have a wide range of political representation. While the Conservative Party of Canada has widespread support throughout the region, the New Democratic Party holds seats at the provincial level in all three provinces, as well as holding seats at the federal level in Alberta and Manitoba. The Liberal Party of Canada presently hold four federal seats in Winnipeg, while the Manitoba Liberal Party holds three seats in Manitoba.

See also 

Dominion Land Survey
High Plains (United States)
List of regions of Canada
Llano Estacado
Natural Resources Acts
Shortgrass prairie
Ecozones of Canada

References

Further reading 

 Alberta Encyclopedia Online (2005)
 Archer, John H. Saskatchewan: A History (1980)
 Barnhart, Gordon L., ed. Saskatchewan Premiers of the Twentieth Century. (2004). 418 pp.
 Bennett, John W. and Seena B. Kohl. Settling the Canadian-American West, 1890–1915: Pioneer Adaptation and Community Building. An Anthropological History. (1995). 311 pp. online edition
 Danysk, Cecilia. Hired Hands: Labour and the Development of Prairie Agriculture, 1880–1930. (1995). 231 pp.
 Emery, George. The Methodist Church on the Prairies, 1896–1914. McGill-Queen's U. Press, 2001. 259 pp.
 The Encyclopedia of Saskatchewan: A Living Legacy. U. of Regina Canadian Plains Research Center, 2005. online  1071 pp in print edition
 Fairbanks, C. and S.B. Sundberg. Farm Women on the Prairie Frontier. (1983)
 
 Hodgson, Heather, ed. Saskatchewan Writers: Lives Past and Present. Regina: Canadian Plains Research Center, 2004. 247 pp.
 Jones, David C. Empire of Dust: Settling and Abandoning the Prairie Dry Belt. (1987) 316 pp.
 Keahey, Deborah. Making It Home: Place in Canadian Prairie Literature. (1998). 178 pp.
 Kononenko, Natalie "Vernacular religion on the prairies: negotiating a place for the unquiet dead," Canadian Slavonic Papers 60, no. 1-2 (2018)
 Langford, N. "Childbirth on the Canadian Prairies 1880-1930." Journal of Historical Sociology, 1995. Vol. 8, No. 3, pp. 278–302.
 Langford, Nanci Louise. "First Generation and Lasting Impressions: The Gendered Identities of Prairie Homestead Women." PhD dissertation U. of Alberta 1994. 229 pp. DAI 1995 56(4): 1544-A. DANN95214 Fulltext: ProQuest Dissertations & Theses
 Laycock, David. Populism and Democratic Thought in the Canadian Prairies, 1910 to 1945. (1990). 369 pp.
 Lorenz, Stacy L. "'A Lively Interest on the Prairies': Western Canada, the Mass Media, and a 'World of Sport' 1870-1939." Journal of Sport History 27.2 (2000): 195–227. online
 Melnyk, George. The Literary History of Alberta, Vol. 1: From Writing-on-Stone to World War Two. U. of Alberta Press, 1998. 240 pp.
 Morton, Arthur S. and Chester Martin, History of prairie settlement (1938) 511pp
 Morton, W. L. Manitoba, a History University of Toronto Press, 1957 online edition
 Norrie, K. H. "The Rate of Settlement of the Canadian Prairies, 1870–1911", Journal of Economic History, Vol. 35, No. 2 (Jun., 1975), pp. 410–427 in JSTOR; statistical models
 Palmer, Howard. The Settlement of the West (1977) online edition
 Pitsula, James M. "Disparate Duo" Beaver 2005 85(4): 14–24, a comparison of Saskatchewan and Alberta, Fulltext in EBSCO
 Rollings-Magnusson, Sandra. "Canada's Most Wanted: Pioneer Women on the Western Prairies". Canadian Review of Sociology and Anthropology 2000 37(2): 223–238.  Fulltext: Ebsco
 Swyripa, Frances. Storied Landscapes: Ethno-Religious Identity and the Canadian Prairies (University of Manitoba Press, 2010) 296 pp. .
 Thompson, John Herd. Forging the Prairie West (1998).
 Wardhaugh, Robert A. Mackenzie King and the Prairie West (2000). 328 pp.
 Waiser, Bill, and John Perret. Saskatchewan: A New History (2005).

Historiography 
 Francis, R. Douglas. "In search of a prairie myth: A survey of the intellectual and cultural historiography of prairie Canada." Journal of Canadian Studies 24#3 (1989): 44+ online
 
 Wardhaugh, Robert A., ed. Toward Defining the Prairies: Region, Culture, and History. (2001). 234 pp.
  310 pp.

 
Great Plains
Temperate grasslands, savannas, and shrublands
Grasslands of Canada
Regions of Canada
Prairies
Geography of Alberta
Geography of Saskatchewan
Geography of Manitoba